Płonina may refer to the following places in Poland:
Płonina, Lower Silesian Voivodeship (south-west Poland)
Płonina, Pomeranian Voivodeship (north Poland)